William Alfred Packard (August 26, 1830 – December 2, 1909) was an American classical scholar, born at Brunswick, Maine. He was the son of the educator, Alpheus Spring Packard, Sr., and the brother of entomologist Alpheus Spring Packard. He attended Phillips Academy, Andover and graduated at Bowdoin in 1851, studied at the University of Göttingen in 1857–58, and became a professor at Princeton. He wrote for the Presbyterian Review and the Princeton Review. He died of heart disease in Princeton, New Jersey.

References

External links
 

People from Brunswick, Maine
Bowdoin College alumni
1830 births
1909 deaths
Appleton family